Amrou Al-Kadhi (born 23 June 1990) is a British-Iraqi writer, drag performer, and filmmaker whose work primarily focuses on queer identity, cultural representation and racial politics. Al-Kadhi made a cameo appearance in the 2021 Sony's Spider-Man Universe (SSU) film Venom: Let There Be Carnage as a temporary host of the title character.

Early life and education
Al-Kadhi was born in London to a tight-knit conservative Iraqi Muslim family. They were brought up in Dubai and Bahrain, before the family moved back to London. Al-Kadhi claims that discovering marine biology and quantum physics helped them understand their queer identity. Al-Kadhi has a twin brother.

In 2006, Al-Kadhi was awarded a two-year scholarship to Eton College where they did their A-levels, then graduated from the University of Cambridge with a BA and MPhil in the History of Art.

Al-Kadhi's stage name is Glamrou. It was at the University of Cambridge that they discovered drag, organising events and becoming a "drag mother" to their fellow drag queens in the university's first professional drag band. While at Cambridge, they created and led the musical comedy drag troupe Denim, for which they co-wrote and performed in shows. More recently they have left the troupe in order to concentrate on solo performance in a show called Glamrou: From Quran to Queen.

Career

Films 
Al-Kadhi's first acting role, at the age of fourteen, was in Steven Spielberg's film Munich, where they played the role of an Islamic terrorist's son. They have commented that, as an Arab actor, they have been approached to play the role of a terrorist almost thirty times.

They have two feature films in development: as writer and director, Layla, with Film 4 and Fox Cub Films, and Oh, Molly with BBC Films and Sarah Brocklehurst Productions.

In 2021, Al-Kadhi appeared in the Sony's Spider-Man Universe (SSU) film Venom: Let There Be Carnage as a temporary host of the alien symbiote Venom after he separates from Eddie Brock.

Television
Al-Kadhi has three TV series in development: as writer and creator, Targets, with BBC Drama, as star, co-creator and co-writer, Nefertiti, a comedy series in development with Big Talk Productions, and as co-star, co-creator and co-writer, Beards, in development with Playground Entertainment.

Writing
Al-Kadhi's autobiography, Life as a Unicorn: A Journey From Shame to Pride and Everything In Between, was published in 2019 and tells the story of their estrangement from and final reconciliation with their mother and Islam. In 2020, the autobiography won the Society of Authors' Somerset Maugham Award.

They write a fortnightly opinion column for The Independent, and a monthly column in Gay Times. They have also contributed to GQ, The Guardian, Attitude, CNN and Little White Lies. Al-Kadhi writes on topics ranging from queer identity and Islamophobia to the philosophy of marine biology and film criticism.

Personal life 
Al-Kadhi identifies as queer and non-binary.

Filmography

Film

Television

Stage
2018, Denim: The Reunion Tour, Soho Theatre
2018, The Denim Juniors, Soho Theatre, Edinburgh Fringe
2017, Denim: World Tour, Underbelly, Edinburgh Fringe
2016, Denim, The Vault Festival
2016, Denim Titanique

Awards and honours
In June 2020, in honour of the 50th anniversary of the first LGBTQ Pride parade, Queerty named Al-Kadhi among the fifty heroes "leading the nation toward equality, acceptance, and dignity for all people". In 2020 Al-Kadhi won the Polari First Book Prize for their memoir Life as a Unicorn.

References

External links
Website

Living people
1990 births
British actors
British filmmakers
British journalists
British Muslims
British people of Iraqi descent
British writers
Non-binary drag performers
British LGBT entertainers
LGBT Muslims
Non-binary writers
21st-century LGBT people